William Ormsby-Gore (14 March 1779 – 4 May 1860), known as William Gore until 1815, was a British Member of Parliament.

Life
Born into an Anglo-Irish family as William Gore, the eldest son of William Gore, M.P., of Woodford, County Leitrim, he was the great-great-grandson of William Gore, third and youngest son of Sir Arthur Gore, 1st Baronet, of Newtown, second son of Sir Paul Gore, 1st Baronet, of Magharabag, whose eldest son Paul was the grandfather of Arthur Gore, 1st Earl of Arran. He was educated at Eton College (1796), the Middle Temple (1796) and Merton College, Oxford, where he matriculated in 1797. In 1815 he married Mary Jane Ormsby, daughter and heiress of Owen Ormsby, and assumed by Royal licence the additional surname of Ormsby the same year.

He joined the British Army and served as a lieutenant in the 1st Dragoon Guards in 1800, was promoted to captain in 1802, to major in 1802 and to brevet major in 1813. He went onto half-pay with the 86th Foot in 1815 and as a captain in the 88th Foot. He left the Army in 1829. He was appointed High Sheriff of Shropshire for 1817–18 and High Sheriff of Caernarvonshire for 1820–21.

Ormsby-Gore was elected to the House of Commons for County Leitrim in 1806, a seat he held until 1807, and then represented Caernarvon from 1830 to 1831 and North Shropshire from 1835 to 1857.

He died at Porkington and was buried at Selattyn. He had 3 sons (one of whom predeceased him) and 2 daughters. His eldest son John Ormsby Gore was M.P. for Caernarvonshire and created Baron Harlech in 1876. His second son William became 2nd Baron Harlech after the death of his brother.

References

 
Kidd, Charles, Williamson, David (editors). Debrett's Peerage and Baronetage (1990 edition). New York: St Martin's Press, 1990,

External links 
 

 

1779 births
1860 deaths
People educated at Eton College
Members of the Middle Temple
Alumni of Merton College, Oxford
1st King's Dragoon Guards officers
Members of the Parliament of the United Kingdom for County Leitrim constituencies (1801–1922)
Members of the Parliament of the United Kingdom for Welsh constituencies
Conservative Party (UK) MPs for English constituencies
UK MPs 1806–1807
UK MPs 1830–1831
UK MPs 1837–1841
UK MPs 1841–1847
UK MPs 1847–1852
UK MPs 1852–1857
William
High Sheriffs of Shropshire
High Sheriffs of Caernarvonshire
Younger sons of baronets
86th (Royal County Down) Regiment of Foot officers
88th Regiment of Foot (Connaught Rangers) officers
Members of Parliament for Caernarfon
Tory MPs (pre-1834)
People from County Leitrim